Dennis Peacock (born 19 April 1953) is an English retired professional footballer who played as a goalkeeper. He played for Nottingham Forest from 1971 until 1975.

References

1953 births
Living people
Sportspeople from Lincoln, England
English footballers
Association football goalkeepers
Nottingham Forest F.C. players
Walsall F.C. players
Doncaster Rovers F.C. players
Bolton Wanderers F.C. players
Burnley F.C. players
English Football League players